Hill+Knowlton Strategies is an American global public relations consulting company, headquartered in New York City, United States, with over 80 offices in more than 40 countries.  The company was founded in Cleveland, Ohio, in 1927 by John W. Hill and has been led since 2019 by Chairman & CEO AnnaMaria DeSalva. It is owned by the WPP Group.

The firm has been involved in multiple controversial public relations campaigns over its history, most notably the false testimony by Nayirah and PR campaign on behalf of the Government of Kuwait in the lead up to the Gulf War.

History

Early history

The company that became Hill+Knowlton Strategies was founded in 1927 by newspaper reporter and businessman John Hill in  Cleveland, Ohio.  Hill's first two clients were Cleveland-based Union Trust Company, and the Otis Steel Company.  When Union Trust Company was shut down by the Great Depression in 1933, Hill hired its former director of advertising and publicity Don Knowlton, and they together established Hill & Knowlton of Cleveland.  Hill moved to New York City in 1934 to open a new Hill & Knowlton office.  Knowlton remained in Cleveland and operated the original location until his retirement in 1964.  Hill served as chairman and chief executive until 1962, but remained on the firm's policy committee, and continued to go into the office until shortly before his death in 1977.

Starting in the 1930s, the firm became known for its representation of steel manufacturers, which it also did during the steel strike of 1952.  The company also represented the dairy industry during congressional debates on margarine regulation in the late 1940s.  Other early clients included the tobacco industry, which the firm worked for when smoking was first publicly linked to cancer in 1953, as well as many other industries including the aircraft industry, the American Shipbuilders Council, the National Retail Dry Goods Association, the National Fertilizer Association, and soap producers.

When Hill died in 1977, the company had 560 employees, with 36 offices in the United States and 18 abroad.

1980s and 1990s

The firm was acquired in 1980 by the JWT Group, one of the largest advertising agencies at the time. Following the acquisition, Hill & Knowlton continued to operate as an independent entity under the JWT Group.  The company expanded to China in 1984, and acquired both Gray & Company and Carl Byoir & Associates, two public relations firms with a national presence in the United States, in 1986.  JWT was acquired by the WPP plc, a London-based marketing and communications holding company, in 1987.  In 1989, Hill & Knowlton acquired Canada's largest PR agency, the Public Affairs Resource Group.

Also during the late 1980s, Hill & Knowlton represented the Bank of Credit and Commerce International (BCCI) during its money laundering scandal. Hill & Knowlton's work was investigated by a U.S. Senate subcommittee, and allegations were made that the firm had pressured regulators to not investigate the bank, though no evidence was found to support the claims.  After BCCI was convicted of money laundering, the firm severed their relationship with BCCI.

Hill & Knowlton was hired in 1990 by Citizens for a Free Kuwait, a group predominantly funded by the Government of Kuwait, to assist its campaign for U.S. intervention in response to the invasion and annexation of Kuwait by Iraq.  The firm arranged for a Kuwaiti girl, known only as Nayirah, to testify in October 1990 to the Human Rights Caucus of the United States Congress about events she had allegedly witnessed. She reported seeing Iraqi soldiers remove babies from incubators in Kuwaiti hospitals and leave them to die. Her testimony was used to build U.S. public and congressional support for the Gulf War. It was later discovered that she was the daughter of the Kuwaiti Ambassador to the United States and that her story was false. Hill & Knowlton was accused of spreading false information to increase support for the Gulf War, which the company denied. The company received around $10 million for their work for Citizens for a Free Kuwait.

Hill & Knowlton represented The Church of Scientology from 1987 until May 1991.  The Church of Scientology then sued the firm, claiming that their contract was terminated because Hill & Knowlton was pressured to do so by Eli Lilly and Company, a client of JWT. Eli Lilly and Company produce the drug Prozac, which the Church staunchly and publicly opposed.  The matter was settled out of court.

2000s to present

The firm continued to expand through acquisitions in the 2000s, including the acquisition of a portion of Argentine company Vox Consulting in 2000, Miami-based public relations agency SAMCOR in 2002, and a majority ownership of the Hong Kong-based Rikes Communications in 2008. In 2010, the company opened three new offices in China as well as new offices in India and Colombia.  In 2009, the firm opened its first office in Nairobi in partnership with Kenyan company Scangroup.

In January 2011, Hill & Knowlton announced a merger with Public Strategies, another WPP company founded in Austin, Texas in 1988.  In December 2011, the firm was rebranded as "Hill+Knowlton Strategies." Jack Martin, founder of Public Strategies, oversaw this rebranded company from 2011 until 2019.

Current operations
The firms' clients reportedly represent fifty percent of Fortune 500 companies.  The company serves a variety of industries including automotive, banking and finance, energy, governments, sports marketing, healthcare and pharmaceuticals, technology communications, consumer goods and services, food and beverage, and the travel, leisure, and tourism industry.  The company has also worked with governing bodies, federations, and sponsors for every Olympic Games since the 2000 Summer Olympics in Sydney. They also worked on the World Health Organization-funded COVID-19 campaign.

Recognition

From 2008 to 2012, H+K Strategies worked for the Special Court for Sierra Leone to draw attention to the court's work prosecuting war criminals in Sierra Leone.  The court was able to raise more than $12.5 million in financing to convict former Liberian president Charles Taylor.  In 2013, the firm's work was included in PRWeek's list of "great work of the last 15 years".

Controversies

As described above, the firm has been involved in controversial events over its history.  These include the tobacco industry in the 1950s and 1960s, the Bank of Credit and Commerce International from 1988–1990, the false testimony and PR campaign planned by Hill+Knowlton on behalf of the Government of Kuwait in the lead up to the Gulf War, and the Church of Scientology from 1987–1991. The company has also been criticized for representing governments seeking to improve their reputations despite accusations of human rights violations, such as Indonesia, Turkey, Maldives, and Uganda.  The company is one of a number of firms engaged by fracking interests in recent years. Hill+Knowlton Strategies co-founded in the 1970s the Asbestos Information Association, which by denying the health risks of asbestos is responsible for thousands of lost lives. Hill+Knowlton was also involved in similar practices concerning lead, vinyl chloride and CFC. During many of these operations Hill+Knowlton worked with Fred Singer.

In November 2022, the company, as official PR firm for the COP27 climate summit in Egypt, was criticized by scientists and environmentalists for having an apparent conflict of interest  - also working for the fossil fuel corporations whose products contribute to the climate problem.

References

Further reading

External links
 Official Hill+Knowlton Strategies website

Public relations companies of the United States
Multinational companies headquartered in the United States
Consulting firms established in 1927
WPP plc
Reputation management companies